Gale Ann Gordon, MSC, USNR (born 1942) is an American experimental psychologist and naval aviator. In 1966 she became the first female Navy pilot to solo in a Navy training plane.

Life
Gale Ann Gordon was born in Ohio in 1942. Gordon gained a masters in experimental psychology from Michigan State University in 1965, and was assigned to Pensacola Naval Air Station as a member of the Medical Service Corps. Training to become an aviation experimental psychologist, she was commissioned as a member of the flight surgeon class at Pensacola in September 1965, the only woman in a squadron of 999 men. On March 25, 1966, she flew solo in a Beechcraft T-34 Mentor at Saufley Field. This made her the first woman in the history of the Naval Air Training Command to solo a Navy training plane.

References

1943 births
Living people
Michigan State University alumni
Experimental psychologists
20th-century American psychologists
Women United States Naval Aviators